The Trap may refer to:

Film 
 The Trap (1913 film), a lost silent film starring Lon Chaney
 The Trap (1914 film), a dramatic short starring Harry von Meter
 The Trap (1918 film), an American drama film starring Alice Brady
 The Trap (1919 film), an American drama film starring Olive Tell
 The Trap (1922 film), an American silent Western starring Lon Chaney
 The Trap (1946 film), a Charlie Chan film starring Sidney Toler
 The Trap (1949 film), an Argentine film directed by Carlos Hugo Christensen
 The Trap (1950 film), a Czech drama directed by Martin Frič
 The Trap (1959 film), a crime drama directed by Norman Panama
 The Trap (1966 film), an adventure/romance starring Oliver Reed and Rita Tushingham
 The Trap (1985 film), an Italian erotic thriller starring Tony Musante and Laura Antonelli
 The Trap (2007 film) or Klopka, a Serbian film
 The Trap, a 2007 short film starring Jeanne Tripplehorn and Camilla Belle
 The Trap, a 2017 short film in competition at the 67th Berlin International Film Festival
 The Trap (2019 film), a film starring Mike Epps and T.I.

Television 
 The Trap (American TV series), also known as Sure as Fate, a 1950 American television anthology series which was broadcast on CBS
 The Trap (British TV series), a 2007 British documentary television series by Adam Curtis
 "The Trap" (Captain Scarlet), an episode of Captain Scarlet and the Mysterons
 "The Trap" (Code Lyoko), the fourteenth episode of Code Lyoko and the nineteenth episode of Code Lyoko: Evolution
 "The Trap" (The Flash), an episode of The Flash

Other uses 
 "The Trap", a song by Tally Hall on their 2011 album Good & Evil
"The Trap" (song), a song by X Marks the Pedwalk
"The Trap", song by Ron Goodwin from the 1966 film The Trap

Books
 "The Trap" (short story), a 1932 short story co-written by H. P. Lovecraft
 "The Trap", a 2000 short story by Christine Harris
 The Trap, a novel by Dan Billany

Places
 Old Trap, North Carolina, U.S., or The Trap, an unincorporated community
 Neutral zone trap or simply "the trap", a defensive strategy in ice hockey

See also
 Trap (disambiguation)
 Trapped (disambiguation)
 Trapper (disambiguation)